The Adams Home Farm is a historic farm property at 15293 Adams Road, in rural Sussex County, Delaware, roughly midway between Greenwood and Bridgeville. Five of its buildings (the house, a granary, two barns, and a carriage house) date to the c. 1850-70 period when the farm was first developed, and its other buildings reflect the evolutionary change in agricultural uses of the land over the following century.

The property was added to the National Register of Historic Places in 2015.

See also
National Register of Historic Places listings in Sussex County, Delaware

References

Houses on the National Register of Historic Places in Delaware
Houses in Sussex County, Delaware
National Register of Historic Places in Sussex County, Delaware
Farms on the National Register of Historic Places in Delaware